Ram Pradhan Committee officially known as the High-Level Enquiry Committee (HLEC) on 26/11, the Pradhan Inquiry Commission was appointed by the Maharashtra Government on 30 December 2008, to probe the response to the 2008 Mumbai attacks.

This was a two-member committee comprising former home secretary Ram Pradhan and former IPS officer Vappala Balachandran. The committee evaluated lapses in the law enforcement agencies and suggests measures to prevent events like 26/11 Mumbai attacks.  On 21 December 2009 the committee report was presented to the then chief minister described the Mumbai attacks as "war-like" attack and also found that it was beyond the capacity of the Mumbai Police.
The committee submitted its report to the Chief Minister of Maharashtra in April 2009, but the government did not release it, citing security concerns.  In December 2009, after substantial portions of the report had been leaked in the media and much agitation had been conducted by the opposition in the state assembly, a Marathi translation was tabled before the assembly.

Aims
The aim of the commission was to "analyse how far the existing procedures, instruments and administrative culture are to be blamed for what are perceived as lapses. Our stress is on identifying systemic failures," as opposed to blaming individuals.

Findings
Intelligence
Action to Handle the Attacks
Means to Face Terrorist Attacks
Command and Control
Coastal Security
Modernisation of Police
Anti-Terrorist Squad
Flying Squads
Handling of Security Intelligence at Operational Levels

Members
 R.D. Pradhan (chair), formerly Union Home Secretary in the Rajiv Gandhi government.
 Vappala Balachandran, former special secretary, Cabinet Secretariat.

References

2008 Mumbai attacks